The 2021 European Pairs Speedway Championship was the 18th edition of the European Pairs Speedway Championship. the final was held in Mâcon, France on 24 July. 

The title was won by France for the first time.

Final

See also 
 2021 Speedway European Championship

References 

2021
European Championship Pairs
Speedway European Championship
European Pairs Speedway
European Pairs Speedway Championship